In mathematics, convergence tests are methods of testing for the convergence, conditional convergence, absolute convergence, interval of convergence or divergence of an infinite series .

List of tests

Limit of the summand
In this sense, the partial sums are Cauchy only if this limit exists and is equal to zero. The test is inconclusive if the limit of the summand is zero. This is also known as the nth-term test, test for divergence, or the divergence test.

Ratio test
This is also known as d'Alembert's criterion.

 Suppose that there exists  such that
 
 If r < 1, then the series is absolutely convergent. If r > 1, then the series diverges. If r = 1, the ratio test is inconclusive, and the series may converge or diverge.

Root test
This is also known as the nth root test or Cauchy's criterion.

 Let
 
 where  denotes the limit superior (possibly ; if the limit exists it is the same value).
 If r < 1, then the series converges absolutely. If r > 1, then the series diverges. If r = 1, the root test is inconclusive, and the series may converge or diverge.
The root test is stronger than the ratio test: whenever the ratio test determines the convergence or divergence of an infinite series, the root test does too, but not conversely.

Integral test

The series can be compared to an integral to establish convergence or divergence. Let  be a non-negative and monotonically decreasing function such that .  If

then the series converges. But if the integral diverges, then the series does so as well. 
In other words, the series  converges if and only if the integral converges.

-series test
A commonly-used corollary of the integral test is the p-series test. Let . Then  converges if .

The case of  yields the harmonic series, which diverges.

Direct comparison test

Limit comparison test
If , (that is, each element of the two sequences is positive) and the limit  exists, is finite and non-zero, then  diverges if and only if  diverges.

Cauchy condensation test

Let  be a non-negative non-increasing sequence. Then the sum  converges if and only if the sum  converges. Moreover, if they converge, then  holds.

Abel's test

Suppose the following statements are true:

  is a convergent series,
  is a monotonic sequence, and
  is bounded.

Then  is also convergent.

Absolute convergence test

Every absolutely convergent series converges.

Alternating series test

Suppose the following statements are true:

  are all positive,
  and
 for every n, .

This test is also known as the Leibniz criterion.

Dirichlet's test

If  is a sequence of real numbers and  a sequence of complex numbers satisfying

 

 

  for every positive integer N

where M is some constant, then the series

converges.

Cauchy's convergence test

A series  is convergent if and only if for every  there is a natural number N such that

holds for all  and all .

Stolz–Cesàro theorem

Let   and   be two sequences of real numbers. Assume that  is a strictly monotone and divergent sequence and the following limit exists:

Then, the limit

Weierstrass M-test

Suppose that (fn) is a sequence of real- or complex-valued functions defined on a set A, and that there is a sequence of non-negative numbers (Mn) satisfying the conditions
  for all  and all , and
  converges.
Then the series 

converges absolutely and uniformly on A.

Extensions to the ratio test

The ratio test may be inconclusive when the limit of the ratio is 1. Extensions to the ratio test, however, sometimes allows one to deal with this case.

Raabe–Duhamel's test

Let { an } be a sequence of positive numbers.

Define

If

exists there are three possibilities:

 if L > 1 the series converges (this includes the case L = ∞)
 if L < 1 the series diverges
 and if L = 1 the test is inconclusive.

An alternative formulation of this test is as follows. Let } be a series of real numbers. Then if b > 1 and K (a natural number) exist such that

for all n > K then the series {an} is convergent.

Bertrand's test

Let { an } be a sequence of positive numbers.

Define

If

exists, there are three possibilities:

 if L > 1 the series converges (this includes the case L = ∞)
 if L < 1 the series diverges
 and if L = 1 the test is inconclusive.

Gauss's test
Let { an } be a sequence of positive numbers.  If  for some β > 1, then  converges if  and diverges if .

Kummer's test
Let { an } be a sequence of positive numbers. Then:

(1)   converges if and only if there is a sequence  of positive numbers and a real number c > 0 such that .

(2)   diverges if and only if there is a sequence  of positive numbers such that 

and  diverges.

Notes

For some specific types of series there are more specialized convergence tests, for instance for Fourier series there is the Dini test.

Examples 
Consider the series

Cauchy condensation test implies that is finitely convergent if

is finitely convergent. Since

 

() is a geometric series with ratio . is finitely convergent if its ratio is less than one (namely  Thus, is finitely convergent if and only if

Convergence of products 
While most of the tests deal with the convergence of infinite series, they can also be used to show the convergence or divergence of infinite products. This can be achieved using following theorem: Let  be a sequence of positive numbers. Then the infinite product  converges if and only if the series  converges. Also similarly, if  holds, then  approaches a non-zero limit if and only if the series  converges .

This can be proved by taking the logarithm of the product and using limit comparison test.

See also
L'Hôpital's rule
Shift rule

References

Further reading